The 1992 United States House of Representatives elections in Virginia were held on November 3, 1992 to determine who will represent the Commonwealth of Virginia in the United States House of Representatives. Virginia has eleven seats in the House, apportioned according to the 1990 United States Census. Representatives are elected for two-year terms.

Overview

References

See also

 1992 United States House of Representatives elections

Virginia
1992
1992 Virginia elections